Toomas Raadik (born 15 August 1990) is an Estonian professional basketball player for Bærum Basket of the Norwegian BLNO. He is a 2.02 m (6 ft 8 in) tall small forward and power forward. He also represents the Estonian national basketball team internationally.

Awards and accomplishments

Professional career
Kalev
 Estonian League champion: 2013

References

External links
 Toomas Raadik at basket.ee 
 Toomas Raadik at fiba.com

1990 births
Living people
BC Kalev/Cramo players
Estonian men's basketball players
Jämtland Basket players
KK Pärnu players
Korvpalli Meistriliiga players
Power forwards (basketball)
Small forwards
Sportspeople from Pärnu
TTÜ KK players